Meyrié is a commune in the Isère, Rhône-Alpes in southeastern France.

Population

Twin towns — sister cities
Meyrié is twinned with:

  Bossico, Italy (1982)

See also
Communes of the Isère department

References

Communes of Isère
Isère communes articles needing translation from French Wikipedia